The Government of Hungary exercises executive power in Hungary. It is led by the Prime Minister, and is composed of various ministers. It is the principal organ of public administration. The Prime Minister (miniszterelnök) is elected by the National Assembly and serves as the head of government and exercises executive power. The Prime Minister is the leader of the party with the most seats in parliament. The Prime Minister selects Cabinet ministers and has the exclusive right to dismiss them. Cabinet nominees must appear before consultative open hearings before one or more parliamentary committees, survive a vote in the National Assembly, and be formally approved by the President. The cabinet is responsible to the parliament.

Since the fall of communism, Hungary has a multi-party system. A new Hungarian parliament was elected on 8 April 2018. This parliamentary election was the 8th since the 1990 first multi-party election. The result was a victory for Fidesz–KDNP alliance, preserving its two-thirds majority with Viktor Orbán remaining Prime Minister. It was the second election according to the new Constitution of Hungary which went into force on 1 January 2012. The new electoral law also entered into force that day. The voters elected 199 MPs instead of previous 386 lawmakers.

In 2023, there are increasing concern over the commitment of the Hungarian government towards democratic values. Credible sources, including Freedom House and the European Parliament, claim Hungary is no longer a democratic country. Prime Minister Viktor Orban and his leading politicians openly use racist arguments, makeing the normalization of right-wing extremism a valid concern in case of Hungary.

List of cabinets since 1989:

Current government

Following the Hungarian parliamentary election, 2022, the current prime minister, Viktor Orbán is serving with his government since 24 May 2022.

Government history, since 1990

Prime ministers

Minister of the Interior

Ministry of Local Government (2006-2010)

Ministry of Justice and Law Enforcement (2006-2010)

Minister of Foreign Affairs and Trade

The Minister of Foreign Affairs of Hungary is a member of the Hungarian cabinet and the head of the Ministry of Foreign Affairs. The current foreign minister is Péter Szijjártó.

Minister of National Economy

The Minister of National Economy of Hungary is a member of the Hungarian cabinet and the head of the Ministry of National Economy. The current minister of national economy is Mihály Varga.

See also
 Third Republic (since 1989)
 Politics of Hungary
 Foreign relations of Hungary

References

External links
 Hungarian Government

 
Hungary
Politics of Hungary
European governments